Blue Night may refer to:

 "Blue Night", a song on the album Earth Moving by Mike Oldfield
 Blue Night Network of the Toronto Transit Commission
 Blue Night (Michael Learns to Rock album), 2000, or the title track
 Blue Night (Art Blakey album), 1985
 B.L.U.E. Nights, a 2000 album by Bruford Levin Upper Extremities
 Blue Night (film), a 2018 film